Tandi is  a city in Chitwan District, Nepal.

Tandi may also refer to:
 Tandi, Janakpur, a village development committee in Sindhuli District, Nepal
 Tandi, Kosi, a village development committee in Morang District, Nepal
 Tandi (given name), a given name and list of notable people with the given name
 Tandi, a character in the Fallout video game series
 Tandi Andrews, Miss Continental 1986

See also
 Tandy (disambiguation)